Kashino is a rural locality (a village) in Slednevskoye Rural Settlement, Alexandrovsky District, Vladimir Oblast, Russia. The population was 7 as of 2010. There are 5 streets.

Geography 
Kashino is located on the Seraya River, 16 km west of Alexandrov (the district's administrative centre) by road. Sokolovo is the nearest rural locality.

References 

Rural localities in Alexandrovsky District, Vladimir Oblast